Elizabeth L. Paul is an American academic administrator and psychologist. She is the president-elect of Nazareth College. Paul was the 16th president of Capital University. She previously served as executive vice president of Stetson University where she was a tenured professor of psychology. Paul was a longtime faculty member at The College of New Jersey.

Education 
Paul completed a bachelor's degree in psychology and a doctorate in personality psychology at Boston University. She conducted pre-doctoral training at the National Institute of Mental Health. Paul completed a certificate in higher education administration from the Institute for Educational Management at Harvard University.

Career 
From 1992 to 2009, Paul was a vice provost and professor of psychology at The College of New Jersey. She joined Stetson University in 2009 as provost and vice president of academic affairs. In 2015, she became provost and executive vice president. She was also a tenured professor of psychology.

On July 1, 2016, she became the 16th president of Capital University. On September 6, 2019, she announced she would leave the university in June 2020.

Paul is set to become the 10th president of Nazareth College on July 1, 2020, succeeding Daan Braveman.

See also 

 List of women presidents or chancellors of co-ed colleges and universities

References 

Women heads of universities and colleges
Capital University faculty
Heads of universities and colleges in the United States
American women academics
Living people
Year of birth missing (living people)
Place of birth missing (living people)
Boston University College of Arts and Sciences alumni
The College of New Jersey faculty
Stetson University faculty
Nazareth College (New York)
Nazareth College (New York) alumni
American women psychologists
20th-century American psychologists
21st-century American psychologists
21st-century American scientists
21st-century American women scientists
20th-century American women